Saint-Julien-la-Vêtre is a former commune in the Loire department in central France. On 1 January 2019, it was merged into the new commune Vêtre-sur-Anzon.

See also
Communes of the Loire department

References

Saintjulienlavetre